Luciano Serra, Pilot (Italian: Luciano Serra pilota) is a 1938 Italian war drama film directed by Goffredo Alessandrini and starring Amedeo Nazzari, Germana Paolieri and Roberto Villa.

It was screened at the Venice Film Festival in August 1938, where it was awarded the Mussolini Cup for Best Italian Film. It was considered the defining film of Nazzari's career, establishing him as the leading male star in Italy.

The film's assistant director Roberto Rossellini supervised the shooting of footage on location in North Africa. Rossellini made his own directorial debut three years later with The White Ship, and went on to become a leading Italian filmmaker.

Cast 

 Amedeo Nazzari as Luciano Serra 
 Germana Paolieri as Sandra Serra 
 Roberto Villa as Aldo Serra 
 Mario Ferrari as Colonel Franco Morelli 
 Beatrice Mancini as Bice Mancinotti
 Egisto Olivieri as Nardini
 Guglielmo Sinaz as José Ribera 
 Andrea Checchi as Lieutenant Binelli 
 Felice Romano as Mario
 Oscar Andriani as the Military Chaplain
 Nico Pepe as the Count
 Olivia Fried as Dorothy Thompson 
 Silvio Bagolini as the Club Member
 Felice Minotti as Andrea

References

Bibliography 
 Bondanella, Peter. A History of Italian Cinema. Continuum, 2011.
 Gundle, Stephen. Mussolini's Dream Factory: Film Stardom in Fascist Italy. Berghahn Books, 2013.

External links 

 
 
 

1937 films
Italian war drama films
Italian black-and-white films
1930s war drama films
1930s Italian-language films
Films directed by Goffredo Alessandrini
Italian aviation films
1937 drama films
1930s Italian films